Richard Thomas Booth  (July 13, 1918 – November 25, 1987) was an American football player who played professional football in the National Football League (NFL) for the Detroit Lions in 1941 and 1945.

Booth was born in Newell, WV, before moving to East Liverpool, OH where he played high school football alongside his brother Bill, who would go on to play for the Ohio State Buckeyes football team.  Dick Booth played college football at Western Reserve from 1938 to 1941, where he was instrumental in the 1941 Sun Bowl victory against Arizona State.

References

External links

1918 births
1987 deaths
American football running backs
Detroit Lions players
People from
Case Western Spartans football players
People from Hancock County, West Virginia